The  is a suburban electric multiple unit (EMU) train type operated by the West Japan Railway Company (JR-West) in the Kansai region, Chūgoku region and Shikoku region of Japan. Multiple batches of the model have been built with varying differences (particularly motor output control), although the overall general appearance remains similar.

Design of the rolling stock was an improved adaptation of the 221 series, with three pairs of doors per side per car and a transverse seating layout. Production of the train type first began in 1993.

Variants

223-0, 223-2500 series
The first model (223-0) was delivered earlier than expected, and saw introduction into service on 1 April 1994, on the Hanwa Line. On 4 September of the same year, it began serving the Kansai Airport Line Rapid Service as Kansai International Airport opened. The train was initially fitted with luggage racks, for passengers travelling to/from the airport. A 1 + 2 seating configuration has been adopted to allow passengers to place bulky luggage on the floor where necessary.

Between 1996 and 1998, baggage cars were included, but due to lack of use it was reverted. Unable to cope with the increasing passenger traffic, new cars were produced and designated as the 223-2500, based on the 223-2000 model. These cars were introduced in 1999.

The 223-0 and 223-2500 series see regular service on the Osaka Loop Line, Hanwa Line (and Kansai Airport Line), and the Kisei Main Line. They are typically operated in 4+4-car formations, uncoupled at Hineno.

In May 2018, set HE401 was refurbished, and began test running later on the same month.

223-1000 series
This sub-series was manufactured in 1995, and were quickly pressed into service in the summer of the same year to curb dwindling passenger travel in the aftermath of the Great Hanshin earthquake, replacing older 221 series sets on Special Rapid services. The trains sport a higher top service speed of 130 km/h, and were manufactured jointly between Kinki Sharyo, Hitachi, and Kawasaki Heavy Industries. Fold-up seats replace some of the regular ones, in order to increase standing capacity during peak hours. To lower the center of gravity, air-conditioning units have been shifted to the bottom of the carriages.

The 223-1000 series is used on several routes: Hokuriku Main Line, Tōkaidō Main Line, Sanyō Main Line, Kosei Line, Kusatsu Line, and Sagano Line. A total of 92 cars were produced, and they are typically in 4- or 8-car formations.

In Q1 2019, select 223-1000 end cars on 4-car sets underwent modifications to introduce the "A-Seat", a reserved seat service currently found on select 12-car Special Rapid Service trains. On these cars, straight blue stripes run along the sides of the car and the center door is permanently sealed. Seating is in a 2 + 2 configuration and WiFi is equipped along with power outlets.

223-2000 series
In 1999, Kawasaki Heavy Industries and Kinki Sharyo received a further order of 236 cars. This sub-series was built with substantial improvements: for example universal access toilets and heat absorbent windows. Its formation and assignment of routes are similar to the 223-1000 model.

223-5000 series
This sub-series was built in 2003 by Kawasaki Heavy Industries, intended to replace the aging 213 series operating on the Marine Liner services on the Seto-Ōhashi line. It can be coupled to the bilevel JR Shikoku 5000 series, and ATS-P is not utilized. It was subsequently introduced on October 1 of the same year. JR-West classifies its sets as 223-5000, while JR Shikoku classifies its sets as 5000 series. They were delivered as 3 car sets but subsequently reduced to two car sets (plus the Green car).

223-5500 series
16 2-car sets were delivered in 2008, with the first sets entering service in July 2008. These sets are based at Fukuchiyama Depot, and are equipped for wanman driver-only-operation. Formation is KuMoHa223-5500 + KuHa222-5500.

223-6000 series
This sub-series was created by modifying 223-2000 series sets with performance restricted to match that of 221 series sets. The first 4-car set (V25) was returned to service on 21 January 2008. These sets are distinguished by an orange stripe on the front gangway doors between the headlight clusters.

223-9000 series (U@tech)

In September 2004, JR-West unveiled the 3-car "U@tech" (you, Urban Network, ubiquitous, future + technology) experimental EMU converted from former Kawasaki Heavy Industries KuMoHa 223-9001, which was the prototype of the 223-2000 series and Seto-Ōhashi Line 213 series cars. This set was used to test and develop new technology for use on future narrow-gauge trains. It was based at Suita Depot and began testing on the JR Kyoto Line and JR Kobe Line from August 2004, and was withdrawn on 31 March 2019.

Gallery

Operations

JR-West

223-0/2500 series
 Osaka Loop Line
 Hanwa Line (through services from Kansai Airport Line)
 Kansai Airport Line
 Kisei Main Line (Kinokuni Line) ( -  or )

223-1000/2000 series
 Tōkaidō Main Line (Biwako Line, JR Kyoto Line, JR Kobe Line) ( - )
 Sanyō Main Line (JR Kobe Line) (Kōbe - )
 Hokuriku Main Line (Biwako Line) ( - Maibara)
 Kosei Line (through services from Hokuriku Main Line)
 Kusatsu Line
 Akō Line ( - )

223-5000 series
 Seto-Ōhashi Line (Marine Liner)
 Uno Line ( - )
 Honshi-Bisan Line (Chayamachi - )

223-5500 series
 Fukuchiyama Line ( - )
 Sanin Main Line (Sagano Line) ( - )
 Maizuru Line

223-6000 (Aboshi depot) series
 Tōkaidō Main Line (Biwako Line, JR Kyoto Line, JR Kobe Line) (Maibara - Kōbe)
 Sanyō Main Line (JR Kobe Line) (Kōbe - Kamigōri)
 Bantan Line  ( - , sometimes substituted for 103 and 221 series)
 Akō Line (Aioi - Banshū-Akō)

223-6000 (Miyahara depot) series
 Tōkaidō Main Line (JR Kobe Line) ( - )
 Fukuchiyama Line (JR Takarazuka Line) (Amagasaki - Sasayamaguchi or Fukuchiyama)

223-6000 (Kyoto depot) series
 Tōkaidō Main Line (Biwako Line) (Kyoto - Yamashina)
 Kosei Line (Yamashina - Nagahara)
 Sanin Main Line (Sagano Line) (Kyoto - )

JR Shikoku

223-5000 series
 Seto-Ōhashi Line (Marine Liner)
 Honshi-Bisan Line (Kojima - )
 Yosan Line (Utazu - )

Formations

223-0, 223-2500 series

4-car sets (HE prefix)

The KuMoHa 223 and MoHa 223 cars are each fitted with one scissors-type pantograph.

223-1000 series

8-car sets (W prefix)

4-car sets (V prefix)

The KuMoHa 223 and MoHa 223 cars are each fitted with one scissors-type pantograph.

223-2000 series

8-car sets (W prefix)

6-car sets (J prefix)

4-car sets (V prefix)

The KuMoHa 223 and MoHa 223/222 cars are each fitted with one scissors-type pantograph.

223-5000 series

2-car sets (P prefix)

The KuMoHa 223 cars are each fitted with one scissors-type pantograph.

223-5500 series

2-car sets (F prefix)

The KuMoHa 223-5501/5502/5503/5504/5509 cars are equipped with a second de-icing pantograph.

223-6000 series

4-car Aboshi depot sets (CV prefix)

The KuMoHa 223 and MoHa 222 cars are each fitted with one scissors-type pantograph.

4-car Miyahara depot sets (MA prefix)

The KuMoHa 223 and MoHa 223 cars are each fitted with two scissors-type pantograph.

4-car Kyoto depot sets (R prefix)

The KuMoHa 223 and MoHa 222 cars are each fitted with one scissors-type pantograph.

223-9000 series (U@tech)

The KuMoYa 223 end car was fitted with one single-arm pantograph.

Interior

References

Electric multiple units of Japan
West Japan Railway Company
Hitachi multiple units
Train-related introductions in 1993
Kawasaki multiple units
Kinki Sharyo multiple units
1500 V DC multiple units of Japan